The interspinous plane (Planum interspinale) is an anatomical transverse plane that passes through the anterior superior iliac spines. It separates the lateral lumbar region from the inguinal region and the umbilical region from the pubic region.

References

Anatomical planes